Frank Egharevba (born 15 December 1985) is a Nigerian football striker.

Career
After playing in the youth team of SK Rapid Wien until 2003 he moved in summer that year to Ukraine and played for one year with reserves squad of FC Karpaty Lviv.

It was in summer 2004 that Egharevba begin his senior career by signing with Polish club Tomasovia Tomaszów Lubelski where he will stay until summer 2006. During this period he was loaned twice to other stronger Polish clubs, first in the second half of the 2004-05 season to Widzew Łódź and second time in the second half of the 2005-06 to Śląsk Wrocław. After the contract expired in summer 2006, he moved to Switzerland and signed with FC Naters where he will have a major role in the club by scoring 15 goals in 26 league matches. After that season Austrian club SK Schwadorf 1936 signed him in summer 2007, where 9 goals in 24 league matches called the attention of VfB Admira Wacker Mödling to sign him in the next summer. Not having much chances to play with Admira, he will return to Schwadorf as a loaned player for the second half of the 2008-09 season where he will return to the good exhibitions by scoring 7 goals in 14 league matches. At the end of the season Egharevba received an offer from Serbian SuperLiga club FK Javor Ivanjica where he will play 13 league matches scoring once but, probably because of the introduction of foreign players limit by the federation and the fact that the club already had a number of African and South American players made him being dropt from the chart for the second half of the season. In summer 2010 he returned to Austria this time signing with SC Austria Lustenau playing in the Erste Liga. In summer 2011 he moved back to FC Naters playing in the Swiss 1. Liga and scored 13 goals in 23 games.  In summer 2012 he moved to same level Swiss club FC Solothurn.

References

External links
 Frank Egharevba at Srbijafudbal
 
 Frank Egharevba at Playerhistory

1985 births
Living people
Sportspeople from Benin City
Nigerian footballers
Nigerian expatriate footballers
Association football forwards
FC Karpaty Lviv players
Widzew Łódź players
Śląsk Wrocław players
FC Admira Wacker Mödling players
FK Javor Ivanjica players
SC Austria Lustenau players
FC Solothurn players
Tomasovia Tomaszów Lubelski players
FC Naters players
SV Würmla players
Serbian SuperLiga players
Expatriate footballers in Ukraine
Expatriate footballers in Poland
Expatriate footballers in Switzerland
Expatriate footballers in Serbia
Nigerian expatriate sportspeople in Ukraine
Nigerian expatriate sportspeople in Poland
Nigerian expatriate sportspeople in Switzerland
Nigerian expatriate sportspeople in Serbia